Paul McKay may refer to:

 Paul McKay (footballer, born 1971), English footballer
 Paul McKay (footballer, born 1996), Scottish footballer for Queen of the South
 Paul McKay (Canadian football) (born c. 1947), Canadian football player
 Paul McKay, Australian singer; see Linda George
 Captain Paul McKay (died 2014), Australian soldier, one of the very few who committed suicide by hypothermia